Eucademix is an album by Yuka Honda.

Track listing
"Humming Song (Alone Together)" – 3:44
"I Dream About You" – 3:33
"When the Monkey Kills" – 3:26
"Limoncello" – 2:57
"Some Things Should Be Kept Unsaid" – 2:57
"Seed of Seed of Peach" – 3:53
"Twirling Batons in My Head" – 2:55
"How Many Times Can We Burn This Bridge" – 4:08
"Parallel" – 3:06
"Why Are You Lying to Your Therapist" – 3:36
"Phantomime" – 2:42
"Spooning with Jackknife" – 3:27

Personnel 
Brandt Abner – keyboards
Thomas Bartlett – vocals
Trevor Dunn – bass
Timo Ellis – guitars, drums
Petra Haden – vocals
Miho Hatori – vocals
Yuka Honda – drum programming, bass, guitar, piano, keyboards, sampler, vocals
Japa Keenon – drum machine
Phantom – rain
Marc Ribot – guitars

References

2004 albums
Tzadik Records albums
Yuka Honda albums